"Also Sprach Zarathustra (2001)" is an instrumental by Brazilian musician Eumir Deodato, from his 1973 album Prelude. It is a heavily jazz-funk styled rendition of the introduction from the Richard Strauss composition Also sprach Zarathustra.

Released as the album's first single in early 1973, his rendition peaked at number 2 on the U.S. Billboard Hot 100 singles chart on 31 March 1973 (behind Roberta Flack's "Killing Me Softly with His Song"), number 3 in Canada, and number 7 on the UK Singles Chart. It won the 16th Annual Grammy Awards Grammy Award for Best Pop Instrumental Performance.

The track has appeared on many compilation and re-issue albums since 1973.

Charts

Weekly charts

Year-end charts

In popular culture
 The track was used in the 1979 film Being There starring Peter Sellers, as his character leaves home for the very first time.
 Retired professional wrestler and pop culture personality Ric Flair used several versions of the opening fanfare as his entrance theme for the majority of his in-ring career.
 In 2001 it was used by the University of South Carolina Gamecocks football team in their entrance onto the field.

Lead musicians
Eumir Deodato - piano, electric piano
Ron Carter - electric bass, double bass
Stanley Clarke - electric bass 
Billy Cobham - drums
John Tropea - electric guitar
Jay Berliner - guitar
Airto Moreira - percussion
Ray Barretto - congas

References

1973 debut singles
1970s instrumentals
Adaptations of works by Friedrich Nietzsche
1973 songs
Thus Spoke Zarathustra